Candelária Sport Clube is a Rink Hockey team from Candelária, Azores, Portugal. It was founded on 24 January 1990 and  played the 2011 European League Final Eight for the first time of its history.

2010/2011 squad

External links

Rink hockey clubs in Portugal
Sports teams in the Azores